Prostanthera eurybioides, commonly known as Monarto mintbush, is a species of flowering plant in the family Lamiaceae and is endemic to the south-east of South Australia. It is a low, spreading shrub with densely hairy branches, thick, elliptic to egg-shaped leaves clustered on short shoots, and violet to mid-purple flowers that are white with orange and dark purple dots inside the petal tube.

Description
Flowering occurs from September to November.

Taxonomy
Prostanthera eurybioides was first formally described in 1855 by Ferdinand von Mueller in his book Definitions of rare or hitherto undescribed Australian plants.

Distribution and habitat
Monarto mintbush grows amongst granite outcrops in mallee woodland in the Monarto and Mount Monster areas.

Conservation status
This mintbush is classified as "endangered" under the Australian Government Environment Protection and Biodiversity Conservation Act 1999 and the Government of South Australia National Parks and Wildlife Act 1972. The main threats to the species are land clearing, quarry operation at Mount Monster, weed invasion, illegal rubbish dumping, trampling by walkers, and trail bike damage.

References

eurybioides
Lamiales of Australia
Flora of South Australia
Plants described in 1855
Taxa named by Ferdinand von Mueller